Loyola Pre-University College, Manvi was founded by the Jesuits in 2010 to complement the secondary school education of Xavier School, Manvi, which is on the same campus.

In 2015 Loyola began offering degree courses, beyond 6th form.

See also
 List of Jesuit sites

References  

Jesuit development centres
Jesuit universities and colleges in India
Pre University colleges in Karnataka
Universities and colleges in Raichur district
Educational institutions established in 2010
2010 establishments in Karnataka